Mary Begumisa (born in 1976) is a Ugandan politician and woman member of parliament. The office she attained after being elected as a woman representative for Sembabule district during the 2021 Uganda general elections in January.

She is a member of the ruling National Resistance Movement political party.

Education 

Mary completed her primary level education (PLE) at Lwebitakuli primary school, and completed her Uganda Certificate of Education (UCE) for lower secondary education at Bukulula secondary school in Masaka. a school where she later completed her advanced secondary level known as Uganda Advanced Certification of Education (UACE).Begumisa graduate from Makerere University with a bachelor's degree in Social Sciences .

Career 
Mary's career begun taking a shape in 2000, after her appointment as a sub county chief in Rakai district. After graduating from Makerere University in 2003, she resigned and chose to venture into the Tour and Travel Business with her husband Wilbur Begumisa and they later established a Gorilla Trek Africa Adventure Safaris

See also 

 Member of Parliament.
 Parliament of Uganda.
 Sembabule District 
 National Resistance Movement
 List of members of the eleventh Parliament of Uganda

References

External links 

 Website of the Parliament of Uganda.
 Mary Begumisa on Twitter
 Mary Begumisa on Facebook

21st-century Ugandan women politicians
21st-century Ugandan politicians
1976 births
National Resistance Movement politicians
Women members of the Parliament of Uganda
Members of the Parliament of Uganda
Makerere University alumni
Sembabule District
Living people